Bo Aung Din is a 1941 Burmese black-and-white drama film, directed by Shwe Done Bi Aung, starring Khin Maung Yin, Ba Chit and May May Win. The film, produced by British Burma Film Company, was one of the most popular films in the history of Burmese cinema.

Cast
 Khin Maung Yin as Bo Aung Din
 Ba Chit as U Ba Chit
 May May Win as Ma Mya Win

See also
Son Bo Aung Din

References

1941 films
Burmese-language films
Burmese black-and-white films
Films shot in Myanmar